The Greenland national handball team is the national handball team of Greenland and is controlled by the Greenland Handball Federation. Greenland is the only non-independent territory to have its team taken part in the World Men's Handball Championship.

Tournament record

World Championship

Pan American Championship

Nor.Ca. Championship

Player statistics

Most capped players

Top scorers

External links

IHF profile

Men's national handball teams
National sports teams of Greenland